Chelah Horsdal (born June 19, 1973) is a Canadian actress. She is known for her regular roles in the television series Hell on Wheels, When Calls the Heart, and The Man in the High Castle, recurring roles on Stargate SG-1, Level Up, Arrow, and Star Trek: Discovery, and for her roles in the films Aliens vs. Predator: Requiem and Rise of the Planet of the Apes.

Early life
Horsdal was born in Vancouver, British Columbia. She says she "was born to hippie parents while surrounded by friends and family on the 'farm' Headacres." 

She is the daughter of mother Lindsay and folksinger father Valdy. She grew up with her mother in Kitsilano and attended Bayview Elementary followed by Lord Byng Secondary. She began modelling in locally shot TV shows and commercials at 18, and then lived in the Caribbean for a year.

Career
Horsdal began her acting career in 2002. She has since appeared in more than 75 commercials as well as in films and on television. She has played lead and supporting roles on Hell On Wheels, The Man In The High Castle, When Calls The Heart, Candiland, Patterson's Wager, Three Weeks, Three Kids, On Strike For Christmas, Marley & Me; The Puppy Years, and Lifetime's The Client List. She had lead roles in Lying To Be Perfect and Mrs. Miracle. 

Additional credits include leads on the feature Burning Mussolini, Nickelodeon's Gym Teacher: The Movie, co-starring Christopher Meloni and Amy Sedaris, Flirting With Forty with Heather Locklear and the FOX TV pilot The Virgin of Akron, Ohio. Supporting leads include Aliens vs. Predator: Requiem for 20th Century Fox and Possession alongside Sarah Michelle Gellar, as well as Elegy with Ben Kingsley and Penélope Cruz and Rise of the Planet of the Apes with John Lithgow and James Franco. 

Her performances in the short films Dark Room (2006) and The Hostage (2010) both earned Leo nominations for Best Performance. Recurring roles include Battlestar Galactica, Exes & Ohs, The L Word, Stargate: SG1, Saved, DaVinci's Inquest, Whistler, Blackstone, Clue and Cartoon Network's Level Up.

The Hostage, for which Horsdal was nominated for Best Actress at the 2011 Leos, co-starred and was produced by Tahmoh Penikett and Aleks Paunovic. Horsdal was nominated for four more Leo Awards for her guest starring turn on Arctic Air (2013), for Hell On Wheels and When Calls The Heart, and for Patterson's Wager.

Filmography

Film

Television

References

External links
 
 
 

1973 births
Actresses from Vancouver
Female models from British Columbia
Canadian film actresses
Canadian television actresses
21st-century Canadian actresses
Living people